Elk Mountain is a peak at the northern end of the Medicine Bow Mountains. The mountain is the area's most visible feature. It is located south of Interstate 80 in Carbon County. Elk Mountain is the 8th most prominent summit in the state of Wyoming.

Elk Mountain is located in a public landlocked parcel which became the center of federal lawsuit against four hunters from Missouri in 2022. In 2020 and 2021, the hunters used a step ladder and OnX, an application that maps public lands, to "corner-cross" their way over the  owned by Fred Eshelman, an entrepreneur and resident of North Carolina. Corner-crossing is a method of traveling through alternating public and private land without stepping foot on the privately owned parcels by crossing over the corners, which are shared ownership between the government and private owners. Eshelman pressed criminal trespassing charges against the hunters for "crossing into his airspace." They were found not guilty following a jury trial. The civil case could set precedent on who can legally access millions in acreage of public lands. There are 2.44 million acres of landlocked public land in Wyoming, and 8.3 million acres across the entire Western United States.

Radio station KBDY broadcasts from a tower on the summit.  This allows the station to be received over a significant area with only 630 watts of effective radiated power.

References

External links
 

Mountains of Wyoming
Mountains of Carbon County, Wyoming